White Horse is a small unincorporated community located within Salisbury Township in Lancaster County, Pennsylvania.

White Horse sits at the junction of the Old Philadelphia Pike (Pennsylvania Route 340) and Pennsylvania Route 897, east of the village of Intercourse.

External links
 White Horse Fire Company and Ambulance

Unincorporated communities in Lancaster County, Pennsylvania
Unincorporated communities in Pennsylvania